Calima is a genus of hubbardiid short-tailed whipscorpions, first described by Moreno-González & Villarreal in 2012.

Species 
, the World Schizomida Catalog accepts the following four species:

 Calima bremensis Moreno-González & Villarreal, 2012 – Colombia
 Calima embera Moreno-González & Villarreal, 2017 – Colombia
 Calima nutabe Moreno-González & Villarreal, 2017 – Colombia
 Calima valenciorum Moreno-González & Villarreal, 2012 – Colombia

References 

Schizomida genera